Delap Cemetery (or De Lap Cemetery) is a Civil War cemetery located on De Lap Lane (off Ellison Road) in Campbell County, Tennessee.  It contains the graves of approximately 150 Confederate soldiers who died while camped near the base of Pine Mountain in the Jacksboro, Tennessee, area. The cemetery also family members from the nearby community of De Lap.

The soldiers included members of North Carolina's 58th Regiment of the Confederate Army.  The regiment had been formed at Camp Martin in Mitchell County, North Carolina.  They had traveled from Cumberland Gap to Jacksboro, and were assigned to guard Big Creek Gap.  There were approximately 1,000 soldiers camped at Jacksboro.  In addition to North Carolina, there were soldiers from Tennessee and Alabama.

The cemetery was kept up until the 1960s, but had fallen into disrepair. While the plot of land was known to be a cemetery due to the sunken graves, knowledge that it was a military burial ground had been lost. Since Campbell County was strongly pro-Union in sentiment, there was no knowledge of a C.S.A. burial ground.  However, a North Carolina descendant of one of the soldiers visited Campbell County in December 2002 and produced documents verifying the deaths of 50 soldiers at the base of Pine Mountain. After her visit, the local community began work to clear the cemetery.

Fifty military tombstones have been set up at the cemetery. Tennessee’s Sons of Confederate Veterans’ Longstreeet–Zollicoffer Camp # 87 raised the funds for the tombstones.  The cemetery was rededicated on June 11, 2005.

See also
 List of cemeteries in Tennessee

References

External links
 Campbell County Historical Society Delap Cemetery 
 Tennessee History 
 Tennessee GenWeb 
 
 

Protected areas of Campbell County, Tennessee
Cemeteries in Tennessee
Confederate States of America cemeteries
North Carolina in the American Civil War
Tennessee in the American Civil War